Timmerman is a Dutch occupational surname with the meaning "carpenter". It may refer to:

 Adam Timmerman (1971), American football guard
 Axel Timmermann, climate physicist and oceanographer
 Gert Jan Timmerman (1956), Dutch chess player
 George Bell Timmerman, Sr. (1881–1966), American federal judge
 George Bell Timmerman, Jr. (1912–1994), American politician
 Grant F. Timmerman (1919–1944), American marine awarded the Medal of Honor, posthumously
 Héctor Timerman (1953–2018), Argentine journalist, politician, human rights activist and diplomat
 Karl H. Timmermann, first American officer across the Ludendorff Bridge
 Kenneth R. Timmerman (1953), American journalist, political writer and activist
 Lawrence J. Timmerman (1878–1959), American politician
 Lawrence W. Timmerman (1910–2003), American politician
 Petronella Johanna de Timmerman (1723–1786), Dutch poet and scientist
 Vincent Timmerman, Belgian scientist
 Walter Meijer Timmerman Thijssen (1877–1943), Dutch rower
 William Timmerman, American president of SCANA Corporation
 Yvonne Timmerman-Buck (1956), Dutch politician

Timmerman may also refer to:
 12626 Timmerman, a main-belt minor planet
 Lawrence J. Timmerman Airport, an American airport
 USS Timmerman (DD-828), a U.S. Navy vessel

See also 
 Timmer
 Timmermans

References 

Dutch-language surnames
Occupational surnames